Robert or Bob Dietz may refer to:

Robert H. Dietz (1921–1945), American Medal of Honor recipient
Robert S. Dietz (1914–1995), American geophysicist and oceanographer
Robert Edwin Dietz (1818–1897), American businessman
Bob Dietz (1917–1999), American professional basketball player
Robert L. Deitz (1950-), American lawyer and intelligence officer